Nieder-Eschbach is a borough (Ortsbezirk) of Frankfurt am Main, Germany.
After 1465 Nieder-Eschbach belonged to the Archbishopric of Mainz. Ecclesiastical Middle Authority was the Archdeacon of the provost of St. Peter in Mainz.

References

External links

 www.nieder-eschbach.net
 Gewerbegebiet Nieder-Eschbach on Emporis
 www.museum-nieder-eschbach.de

Districts of Frankfurt